Karsten Braasch and Andrei Olhovskiy were the defending champions but did not compete that year.

Mahesh Bhupathi and Max Mirnyi won in the final 6–1, 6–2 against Lucas Arnold and Mariano Hood.

Seeds

  Mahesh Bhupathi /  Max Mirnyi (champions)
  Martin Damm /  Cyril Suk (quarterfinals)
  Tomáš Cibulec /  Pavel Vízner (first round)
  Wayne Arthurs /  Donald Johnson (first round)

Draw

External links
 2003 Estoril Open Men's Doubles draw

2003 Men's Doubles
Doubles
Estoril Open